José Padrón Martín (5 May 1907 – 3 December 1966) was a Spanish footballer who played for RCD Espanyol, Sevilla FC and FC Barcelona in Spain and various clubs in France.

Club career
A native of Las Palmas, the capital of Gran Canaria and the co-capital of the Canary Islands, Padrón played five times for the Spain national team, scoring two goals. He made his début in a 5–0 victory against Portugal on 17 March 1929, scoring two goals.

He won the Copa del Rey with Espanyol in 1928–29; he is listed in some sources as one of the goalscorers in the final, and in others as one of five players sent off (there is confusion between him and Francisco Tena in both respects).

After leaving French team Cannes in 1937, he signed for Sochaux in Ligue 1, where he won the 1937–38 championship, playing just eight games and scoring two goals.

International career
He earned 5 caps for the Spanish national team, making his debut on 17 March 1929, aged 19 years 10 months and 12 days, in a Friendly against Portugal, scoring two goals in a 5-0 win. He also was one of the eleven footballers that played for Spain in the infamous Spain v England football match on 15 May 1929.

International goals
''Spain score listed first, score column indicates score after each Padrón goal.

Retirement
During World War II, he served under Raymond Dronne as part of the Free France, being part of the North African campaign, the Normandy landings, and took part in the Liberation of Paris from the Nazis. He died in the Pitié-Salpêtrière Hospital on 3 December 1966

Honours

Club
RCD Espanyol
Copa del Rey:
Winners (1) 1928-29

References

External links

 La Liga profile
 Profile

1906 births
1966 deaths
Association football midfielders
Spanish footballers
Footballers from Las Palmas
Spain international footballers
Catalonia international guest footballers
La Liga players
RCD Espanyol footballers
Sevilla FC players
FC Barcelona players
Olympique Alès players
AS Cannes players
FC Sochaux-Montbéliard players
Red Star F.C. players
Stade de Reims players
Ligue 1 players
Ligue 2 players
OFC Charleville players